Susan Kaye McClary (born October 2, 1946) is an American musicologist associated with "new musicology". Noted for her work combining musicology with feminist music criticism, McClary is professor of musicology at Case Western Reserve University.

Early life and education
McClary was born in St. Louis, Missouri, and received her BA in 1968 from Southern Illinois University. She attended graduate school at Harvard University where she received her MA in 1971 and her PhD in 1976. Her doctoral dissertation was on the transition from modal to tonal organization in Monteverdi's works. The first half of her dissertation was later reworked and expanded in her 2004 book, Modal Subjectivities: Self-fashioning in the Italian Madrigal. She taught at the University of Minnesota (1977–1991), McGill University (1991–1994), University of California, Berkeley (1993), and University of California, Los Angeles (1994–2011), before becoming a Professor of Musicology at Case Western Reserve University. She has also held a five-year professorship at the University of Oslo (2007–2012).

Career
One of her best known works is Feminine Endings (1991). "Feminine ending" is a musical term once commonly used to denote a weak phrase ending or cadence. The work covers musical constructions of gender and sexuality, gendered aspects of traditional music theory, gendered sexuality in musical narrative, music as a gendered discourse, and discursive strategies of women musicians.

McClary suggests that sonata form may be interpreted as sexist or misogynistic and imperialistic, and that, "tonality itself – with its process of instilling expectations and subsequently withholding promised fulfillment until climax – is the principal musical means during the period from 1600 to 1900 for arousing and channeling desire." She interprets the sonata procedure for its constructions of gender and sexual identity. The primary, "masculine" key (or first subject group) represents the male self, while the secondary, "feminine" key (or second subject group), represents the other, a territory to be explored and conquered, assimilated into the self and stated in the tonic home key.

McClary set the feminist arguments of her early book in a broader sociopolitical context with Conventional Wisdom (2000). In it, she argues that the traditional musicological assumption of the existence of "purely musical" elements, divorced from culture and meaning, the social and the body, is a conceit used to veil the social and political imperatives of the worldview that produces the classical canon most prized by musicologists. She examines the creation of meanings and identities, some oppressive and hegemonic, some affirmative and resistant, in music through the referencing of musical conventions in the blues, Vivaldi, Prince, Philip Glass, and others.

While seen by some as extremely radical, her work is influenced by musicologists such as Edward T. Cone, gender theorists and cultural critics such as Teresa de Lauretis, and others who, like McClary, fall in between, such as Theodor Adorno. McClary herself admits that her analyses, though intended to deconstruct, engage in essentialism.

"Constructions of Subjectivity in Franz Schubert's Music"
"Constructions of Subjectivity in Franz Schubert's Music" first appeared as a paper delivered at the American Musicological Society in 1990 and then in a revised version as a symposium presentation during the 1992 Schubertiade Festival in New York City. At the time McClary was influenced by Maynard Solomon's claim in his 1989 paper "Franz Schubert and the Peacocks of Benvenuto Cellini" that Schubert was homosexual. McClary's paper explored the relevance of Solomon's research to what she termed the uninhibited, "hedonistic" luxuriance of Schubert's "Unfinished" Symphony. The symposium paper elicited some mild controversy. Following evidence that Solomon's conclusions may have been flawed and largely based on his own psychoanalytic reading of a dream narrative Schubert set down in 1822, McClary revised the paper again. Its definitive version was printed in the 1994 edition of the book Queering the Pitch: The New Gay and Lesbian Musicology edited by Philip Brett, Elizabeth Wood, and Gary Thomas.

According to McClary, Schubert, in the second movement of his Unfinished Symphony, foregoes the usual narrative of the sonata form by "wandering" from one key area to another in a manner which does not consolidate the tonic, but without causing its violent reaffirmation:

What is remarkable about this movement is that Schubert conceives of and executes a musical narrative that does not enact the more standard model in which a self strives to define identity through the consolidation of ego boundaries...in a Beethovian world such a passage would sound vulnerable, its tonal identity not safely anchored; and its ambiguity would probably precipitate a crisis, thereby justifying the violence needed to put things right again.

While maintaining that attempting to read Schubert's sexuality from his music would be essentialism, she proposes that it may be possible to notice intentional ways in which Schubert composed in order to express his "difference" as a part of himself at a time when "the self" was becoming prominent in the arts. Schubert's music and often the man himself and the subjectivity he presented have been criticized as effeminate, especially in comparison to Beethoven, the model and aggressive master of the sonata form (Sir George Grove, after Schumann: "compared with Beethoven, Schubert is as a woman to a man"; Carl Dahlhaus: "weak" and "involuntary"). However, McClary notes: "what is at issue is not Schubert's deviance from a "straight" norm, but rather his particular constructions of subjectivity, especially as they contrast with many of those posed by his peers."

Some of the ideas about composition as subjective narrative proposed in "Constructions" were developed by McClary in her 1997 article, "The Impromptu that trod on a loaf", which applies this analysis to Schubert's Impromptu Op. 90, Number 2. "Constructions of Subjectivity in Franz Schubert's Music" and the ideas in it continue to be discussed, sometimes critically. However, the article influenced a number of queer theorists, and in 2003 was described by the musicologist, Lawrence Kramer, as still an important paper in the field. The paper, and the reactions to it are also discussed in Mark Lindsey Mitchell's Virtuosi: A Defense and a (sometimes Erotic) Celebration of Great Pianists.

Criticism
In the January 1987 issue of Minnesota Composers Forum Newsletter, McClary wrote of Ludwig van Beethoven's Ninth Symphony:
The point of recapitulation in the first movement of the Ninth is one of the most horrifying moments in music, as the carefully prepared cadence is frustrated, damming up energy which finally explodes in the throttling murderous rage of a rapist incapable of attaining release.

This sentence elicited and continues to elicit a great range of responses. McClary subsequently rephrased this passage in Feminine Endings:
'[...] [T]he point of recapitulation in the first movement of Beethoven's Ninth Symphony unleashes one of the most horrifyingly violent episodes in the history of music. The problem Beethoven has constructed for this movement is that it seems to begin before the subject of the symphony has managed to achieve its identity. (128)

She goes on to conclude that "The Ninth Symphony is probably our most compelling articulation in music of the contradictory impulses that have organized patriarchal culture since the Enlightenment" (129). The critiques of McClary discussed below refer primarily to the original version of the passage. Several commentators have objected to McClary's characterizations, including Robert Anton Wilson, Elaine Barkin, and Henry Kingsbury.

Music theorist Pieter van den Toorn has complained that McClary's polemics negate the asocial autonomy of absolute music; he is concerned with formal analysis in the tradition of Schenker.. Van den Toorn complains, for example, that "Fanned by an aversion for male sexuality, which it depicts as something brutal and contemptible, irrelevancies are being read into the music." Van den Toorn's complaint was rebutted by musicologist Ruth Solie. Van den Toorn responded with a book on these issues. Musicologist Paula Higgins, in another critique of McClary's work, has observed that "one wonders ... if [McClary] has not strategically co-opted feminism as an excuse for guerrilla attacks on the field." Higgins complains of McClary's "truculent verbal assaults on musicological straw men", and observes that "For all the hip culture critique imported from other fields, McClary has left the cobwebs of patriarchal musicological thought largely intact." Higgins is also critical of McClary's citation practice as it concerns other scholars in the area of feminist musical criticism.

The pianist and critic Charles Rosen has also commented on the famous passage. He avoids taking offense on any of the grounds mentioned above, and is willing to admit sexual metaphors to musical analysis. Rosen's disagreement is simply with McClary's assessment of the music:

We have first her characterization of the moment of recapitulation in the first movement of Beethoven's Ninth Symphony:

The phrase about the murderous rage of the rapist has since been withdrawn [as noted above], which indicates that McClary realized it posed a problem, but it has the great merit of recognizing that something extraordinary is taking place here, and McClary's metaphor of sexual violence is not a bad way to describe it. The difficulty is that all metaphors oversimplify, like those entertaining little stories that music critics in the nineteenth century used to invent about works of music for an audience whose musical literacy was not too well developed. I do not, myself, find the cadence frustrated or dammed up in any constricting sense, but only given a slightly deviant movement which briefly postpones total fulfillment.

To continue the sexual imagery, I cannot think that the rapist incapable of attaining release is an adequate analogue, but I hear the passage as if Beethoven had found a way of making an orgasm last for sixteen bars. What causes the passage to be so shocking, indeed, is the power of sustaining over such a long phrase what we expect as a brief explosion. To McClary's credit, it should be said that some kind of metaphorical description is called for, and even necessary, but I should like to suggest that none will be satisfactory or definitive.

McClary also notes that she "can say something nice about Beethoven", saying of his String Quartet, Op. 132, "Few pieces offer so as vivid an image of shattered subjectivity the opening of Op. 132."

Writing over thirty years after its publication, McClary observed:

People often ask me if I regret having written this essay. I have lived with the consequences for over thirty years, and no matter how much I publish on modal theory or Kaija Saariaho, I will always be identified with this sentence, nearly always taken out of context. I hasten to mention that I have taught a course on Beethoven quartets every other year since 1980; unless a student has googled me and asked about the controversy, no one in my classes would have any inkling of my presumed hatred of this composer. But no, je ne regrette rien. I still stand by my argument and even my imagery after all these years.

Personal life 
McClary is married to musicologist Robert Walser.

Selected bibliography

References

Sources

Further reading

External links
Susan McClary - Curriculum Vitae (as of August 2013)
 
 TRANS 15 (2011), Celebrating the 20th anniversary of Feminine Endings by Susan McClary: Special issue dedicated to Gender Studies, Feminism, and Music.
 UCLA Department of Musicology, Biography of Susan McClary
 Susan McClary, "In Praise of Contingency: The Powers and Limits of Theory", Keynote Address, Society for Music Theory 2009 Annual Meeting, Montréal, Canada
 Lawrence Kramer with reply by Charles Rosen, "Music à La Mode", The New York Review of Books, Volume 41, Number 15, September 22, 1994
 La Susanna, opera by Alessandro Stradella (part 1) as performed by the College of Music, Case Western Reserve University, production directed by Susan McClary (2018)

Gender studies academics
MacArthur Fellows
1946 births
Living people
Harvard University alumni
American women musicologists
Feminist musicians
20th-century American musicologists
21st-century American musicologists
20th-century American women writers
20th-century American non-fiction writers
21st-century American women writers
21st-century American non-fiction writers
Writers from St. Louis
Southern Illinois University alumni